Monica Fiorella Pimentel Rodriguez (born 7 January 1989) is an Aruban taekwondo practitioner. She competed in the 49 kg division at the 2016 Summer Olympics and lost to Yasmina Aziez in the preliminaries.

References

1989 births
Living people
Aruban female taekwondo practitioners
Olympic taekwondo practitioners of Aruba
Taekwondo practitioners at the 2016 Summer Olympics
Pan American Games competitors for Aruba
Taekwondo practitioners at the 2015 Pan American Games